770 Broadway is a  landmarked mixed-use commercial office building in NoHo, Manhattan, in Lower Manhattan, New York City, occupying an entire square block between 9th Street on the north, Fourth Avenue to the east, 8th Street to the south, and Broadway to the west. The building is owned and managed by Vornado Realty Trust. It was completed in 1907 and renovated in 2000 per a design by Hugh Hardy. 

Major tenants include Wegmans, with an  ground floor retail store scheduled to open in 2023, Meta Platforms, which occupies  and has sole roof access, and Yahoo!, which occupies the fourth, fifth, sixth and ninth floors.

The building has one of the largest property tax bills in commercial real estate: $19.6 million in 2022.

History
770 Broadway was built between 1903 and 1907 and was designed by Daniel Burnham as an annex to the original Wanamaker's department store in New York, which was across 9th Street to the north. The two buildings were connected by a sky bridge, dubbed the "Bridge of Progress", as well as a tunnel under 9th Street. The building originally included a central court and an auditorium with a pipe organ that hosted top musicians and orchestras, and was also an early television studio.

In 1954, Wanamaker's closed as department stores expanded to the suburbs. The northern lot was sold in 1955. In 1956, a fire gutted the original Wanamaker's department store building while it was under demolition, injuring 77 people. The annex at 770 Broadway survived and was leased up; in 1958, the ground floor was leased to the United States Army, in 1959, Manhattan Savings Bank leased space for a branch in the building.

In November 1996, Kmart opened a store in the ground floor retail space.

In July 1998, Vornado Realty Trust acquired the building for $149 million. In 2000, the building was renovated per a design by Hugh Hardy.

In 2016 and again in 2022, the building was refinanced, in both instances with a $700 million loan.

In July 2021, the Kmart store was closed and the space was leased to Wegmans, scheduled to open in 2023.

References

External links
 

1907 establishments in New York City
Astor Place
Broadway (Manhattan)
Commercial buildings completed in 1907
Office buildings in Manhattan
Park Avenue